The Ethel Walker School, also commonly referred to as “Walker’s”, is a private, college preparatory, boarding and day school for girls in grades 6 through 12 plus postgraduate located in Simsbury, Connecticut.

History 
Founded in 1911, the school was one of the first college preparatory schools for girls in the United States. The school sits on 175 acres (0.71 km2), abutting 425 acres (1.72 km2) of preserved land. The area is surrounded by forest and residential areas.

The Ethel Walker School was originally located in Lakewood, New Jersey, before being moved in 1917 to its present location on the former Dodge Estate in Simsbury, Connecticut. The school's founder, Ethel Walker, was interested in creating one of the first girls' college preparatory schools, as an alternative to the finishing schools that were then in vogue for upper-class girls.

Curriculum 
Academics at Walker's include many advanced, skills-based courses. Class sizes are small and many classrooms are set up in a style to encourage conversation and communication. The Ethel Walker School's symbol is the sundial, although for athletics Wally the Wildcat has been adopted as a mascot. The school's motto is Nullas Horas Nisi Aureas which translates to "Nothing But Golden Hours".

Arts 
The arts are an integral part of the curricular and co-curricular content at the school, with choices including oil painting, drawing, pottery, sculpture, digital photography, theatre, music and dance. Performing arts groups perform regularly both on and off campus.

Athletics 
In keeping with Miss Walker's conviction that exercise was essential for success in academics, all Walker's students participate in extracurricular sports, dance, or the arts. The varsity soccer, lacrosse, volleyball, basketball and field hockey teams have all won their divisions over the past several years, and the school competes in the  Founders League as well as numerous athletic leagues such as NEPSAC and WNEPPSA. Athletic offerings include multiple levels of lacrosse, volleyball, field hockey, soccer, basketball, softball, golf, tennis, squash, swimming and skiing. Outdoor adventure, personal fitness, dance and the performing arts are offered to supplement competitive athletics.

Walker's is also recognized for its world-class equestrian program, with students competing at both regional and national levels. The equestrian program has been an integral part of the school since its founding. The school's grounds include horse trails, a cross-country course, indoor and outdoor arenas, a turnout, and a barn.

Notable alumnae 

 Frances Beinecke, President of the National Resources Defense Council
 Juanin Clay, actress
 Ethel du Pont, heiress and socialite
 Mimi Gardner Gates, art historian, Director Emeritus of Seattle Art Museum and Yale University Art Gallery
 Judith Peabody, socialite and philanthropist
Angela "Annie" Peavy, member of the U.S. Para-Dressage Team at the 2016 Olympics
 Georgia B. Ridder
 Mary L. Trump, clinical psychologist, businessperson, and author.
 Sigourney Weaver, actress
 Abra Prentice Wilkin, philanthropist
 Melinda Wortz, art professor, gallery director
Ariana Rockefeller, model and fashion designer
Farahnaz Pahlavi, Princess of Pahlavi Iran, daughter of Mohammad Reza Pahlavi

References

External links 
 

Private high schools in Connecticut
Girls' schools in Connecticut
Preparatory schools in Connecticut
Boarding schools in Connecticut
Buildings and structures in Simsbury, Connecticut
Schools in Hartford County, Connecticut
Private middle schools in Connecticut
1911 establishments in Connecticut